This article contains links to lists of scientists.

By academic genealogy 

 Academic genealogy of chemists
 List of people considered father or mother of a scientific field
 List of the 72 names on the Eiffel Tower
 Apostles of Linnaeus
 List of Arab scientists and scholars
 List of modern Arab scientists and engineers
 List of archaeologists
 Astronomer Royal
 List of astronomers
 List of French astronomers
 List of Fellows of the Australian Academy of Science
 List of biochemists
 List of biologists
 List of marine biologists
 List of biophysicists
 List of carcinologists
 List of Catholic clergy scientists
 List of lay Catholic scientists
 List of chemists
 List of Christians in science and technology
 List of Christian Nobel laureates
 List of Christian scientists and scholars of medieval Islam
 List of climate scientists
 List of women climate scientists and activists
 List of cognitive scientists
 List of coleopterists
 List of computer scientists
 List of cosmologists
 List of criminologists
 List of ecologists
 List of entomologists
 List of Ethiopian scientists
 List of participants in the Evolving Genes and Proteins symposium
 List of Fellows of the Royal Society by election year
 List of foresters
 Fullerian Professor of Chemistry
 Fullerian Professor of Physiology
 List of geneticists
 List of geologists
 List of women geologists
 List of geophysicists
 List of German aerospace engineers in the United States
 List of herpetologists
 List of immunologists
 List of Jewish Nobel laureates
 List of Kyoto Prize winners
 List of atheists in science and technology
 List of loop quantum gravity researchers
 Maria Goeppert-Mayer Award
 List of medieval and pre-modern Persian doctors
 List of meteorologists
 List of microbiologists
 List of mineralogists
 List of minor planet discoverers
 List of Muslim Nobel laureates
 List of National Medal of Science laureates
 List of neurochemists
 List of neurologists and neurosurgeons
 List of nominees for the Nobel Prize in Chemistry
 List of physicians and scientists of Upstate New York
 List of ornithologists
 List of paleoethnobotanists
 List of paleontologists
 List of pathologists
 List of pharmacists
 List of photochemists
 List of physicists
 List of plasma physicists
 List of presidents of the Geological Society of London
 List of presidents of the Geologists' Association
 List of psephologists
 Quakers in science
 List of quantum gravity researchers
 Racah Lectures in Physics
 List of Researchers at Racah Institute
 List of rheologists
 RNA Tie Club
 List of runologists
 Savilian Professor of Astronomy
 List of scientists whose names are used as non SI units
 List of people whose names are used in chemical element names
 List of scientists whose names are used in physical constants
 List of soil scientists
 List of spectroscopists
 List of statisticians
 List of systems scientists
 List of taxonomic authorities by name
 List of undersea explorers
 List of authors of names published under the ICZN

By country, religion, gender or ethnic background 

 List of African educators, scientists and scholars
 List of Argentine scientists
 List of Armenian scientists and philosophers
 List of American scientists 
 List of African-American inventors and scientists
 List of Arab scientists and scholars
 List of Austrian scientists
 List of Azerbaijani scientists and philosophers
 List of Brazilian scientists
 List of Bangladeshi scientists
 List of British scientists
 List of British Jewish scientists
 List of Cornish scientists
 List of Scottish scientists
 List of Welsh scientists
 List of Byzantine scholars (including scientists)
 List of Chinese scientists
 List of Christian scientists
 List of Catholic scientists
 List of Christian Nobel laureates
 List of Jesuit scientists
 List of Roman Catholic cleric-scientists
 List of Quaker scientists
 List of Croatian scientists
 List of Czech scientists
 List of Egyptian scientists
 List of Estonian scientists
 List of female scientists
 List of female scientists before the 20th century
 List of female scientists in the 20th century
 List of female scientists in the 21st century
 List of French scientists
 List of German scientists
 List of Indian scientists
List of Nepalese scientists
 List of Persian scientists and scholars
 List of contemporary Iranian scientists, scholars, and engineers
 List of Italian scientists
 List of Jewish scientists and philosophers
 List of Jewish American chemists
 List of Muslim scientists
 List of New Zealand scientists
 List of Nigerian scientists and scholars
 List of Pakistani scientists
 List of Romanian scientists
 List of Russian scientists
 List of Serbian scientists
 List of Swedish scientists
 List of Turkic scholars

By achievement 

 List of Nobel laureates
 Lists of Nobel laureates

See also 
 Academic genealogy
 History of science and technology
 List of forms of electricity named after scientists
 List of science communicators

 
Lists of people in STEM fields